Zoia Ovsii (born 30 August 1994) is a Ukrainian Paralympic athlete competing in F51-classification throwing events. She won the gold medal in the women's club throw F51 event at the 2020 Summer Paralympics held in Tokyo, Japan. She also won the bronze medal in the women's discus throw F53 event. She also won two medals at the 2016 Summer Paralympics in Rio de Janeiro, Brazil.

She is a two-time gold medalist in the women's club throw F51 event at the World Para Athletics Championships. She also won the gold medal in this event at the 2018 World Para Athletics European Championships in Berlin, Germany.

Career
She represented Ukraine at the 2016 Summer Paralympics held in Rio de Janeiro, Brazil and she won two medals: the silver medal in the women's club throw F51 event and the bronze medal in the women's discus throw F52 event.

In 2014, she competed in paracanoeing at the ICF Canoe Sprint World Championships in Moscow, Russia and she won the bronze medal in the women's V–1 200 m A event.

At the 2018 World Para Athletics European Championships in Berlin, Germany, she set a new world record in the women's club throw F51. She also accomplished this feat at the 2019 World Para Athletics Championships held in Dubai, United Arab Emirates in the women's club throw F51 event with a distance of 25.23.

In 2021, she won the silver medal in the women's club throw F51 and women's discus throw F53 events at the World Para Athletics European Championships held in Bydgoszcz, Poland.

Achievements

Club throw

Discus throw

References

External links

 

Living people
1994 births
Place of birth missing (living people)
People with arthrogryposis
Ukrainian club throwers
Ukrainian female discus throwers
Paralympic athletes of Ukraine
Athletes (track and field) at the 2016 Summer Paralympics
Athletes (track and field) at the 2020 Summer Paralympics
Medalists at the 2016 Summer Paralympics
Medalists at the 2020 Summer Paralympics
Paralympic gold medalists for Ukraine
Paralympic silver medalists for Ukraine
Paralympic bronze medalists for Ukraine
Paracanoeists of Ukraine
ICF Canoe Sprint World Championships medalists in paracanoe
World record holders in Paralympic athletics
World Para Athletics Championships winners
Paralympic medalists in athletics (track and field)
Medalists at the World Para Athletics European Championships
Medalists at the World Para Athletics Championships
Wheelchair discus throwers
Paralympic discus throwers
Paralympic club throwers
21st-century Ukrainian women